Beaver Creek is an unincorporated community in Marengo County, Alabama, United States. Its name is derived from the nearby Beaver Creek and the local church, Beaver Creek Baptist Church.  Beaver Creek had a school at one time, but it was consolidated into Sweet Water High School in the 1920s.

Geography

References

Unincorporated communities in Alabama
Unincorporated communities in Marengo County, Alabama